Amma Sri Karunamayi (born 1958) is a Hindu spiritual leader. Sri Karunamayi travels internationally promoting global peace and meditation.

Early life

Amma Karunamayi was born in South India in 1958.  Karunamayi's mother was a devotee of Bhagawan Ramana Maharshi. On one rare occasion Ramana whispered to Karunamayi's mother that she would give birth to "Thai" or the divine mother who would help heal the planet.  Encouraged by her parents, Karunamayi spent her childhood in spiritual  paths immersed in prayer and worship.

Avatar

Sri Amma Karunamayi's followers claim her to be an Avatar, a manifestation of Vishnu who is born enlightened or fully self-realized. She is called Amma by her devotees, which means "mother" in Amma's native Telugu language and other South Indian languages.

Teaching

Programs
Amma Karunamayi created several charitable programs to help the rural poor and disenfranchised in the extremely poor Andhra Pradesh area where her ashram is located. These provide free educational facilities, housing projects, clean water programs, a free hospital, mobile medical clinics, emergency relief programs, food and clothing donations, and free housing for people who had been dispossessed of their land.

Honors

US Congressman Danny Davis of the Seventh Congressional District of Illinois presented the Golden Eagle Award 2012 to Her Holiness Amma Sri Karunamayi : Bhagavathi Sri Sri Sri Vijayeswari Devi, Founder President of S.M.V.A. Trust, Sri Manidweepa Mahasamsthanam, Nellore District, Andhra Pradesh,India, in recognition of her selfless service and dynamic leadership in providing numerous welfare programs for the underprivileged.

Television program
Karunamayi has a weekly television program, transmitted in India on Gemini TV and also on Bhakti TV.

References

External links
Official Website
Home at Last Book

20th-century Hindu religious leaders
21st-century Hindu religious leaders
Hindu female religious leaders
Living people
1958 births
Women mystics